Carolyn Moxley Rouse (born c. 1965) is an American anthropologist, professor and filmmaker. She is Professor and Chair of the Department of Anthropology at Princeton University.

Biography
Rouse grew up in Del Mar, California, the daughter of a physicist (her father, Carl A. Rouse) and a psychologist (her mother, Lorraine). She encountered discrimination at an early age as her family was prevented from buying a home in Rancho Santa Fe because of their race.

Rouse attended Swarthmore College, graduating in 1987. In her junior year, she studied abroad in Kenya in a program focused on wildlife biology, but found she was much more interested in the people around her, which prompted a turn toward documentary film, then eventually a master's in visual anthropology and a Ph.D. in anthropology from the University of Southern California.

Rouse's siblings are both academics; her brother is a professor of physics and her sister, Cecilia Rouse, is the Katzman-Ernst Professor in Economics and Education, and professor of economics and public affairs at Princeton University. Cecilia was also the Dean of the Princeton School of Public and International Affairs before stepping down from that position to serve as the Chair of the Council of Economic Advisers for the Biden Administration. Rouse's brother-in-law (Cecilia's husband) is Ford Morrison, son of Nobel Prize-winning author and Princeton professor emeritus Toni Morrison.

Bibliography
 Engaged Surrender: African American Women and Islam (University of California Press, 2004)
 Uncertain Suffering: Racial Healthcare Disparities and Sickle Cell Disease (University of California Press, 2009)
 Televised Redemption: Black Religious Media and Racial Empowerment with John L. Jackson, Jr., and Marla F. Frederick (NYU Press, 2017)
 Development Hubris: Adventures Trying to Save the World (forthcoming)

Filmography
 Chicks in White Satin (1994)
 Purification to Prozac: Treating Mental Illness in Bali (1998)
 Listening as a Radical Act: World Anthropologies and the Decentering of Western Thought (2015)

References

External links
 

Living people
Princeton University faculty
Swarthmore College alumni
American women anthropologists
American documentary filmmakers
People from Del Mar, California
Visual anthropologists
African-American academics
University of Southern California alumni
20th-century American anthropologists
21st-century American anthropologists
20th-century American scientists
21st-century American scientists
African-American activists
21st-century American women writers
21st-century American writers
20th-century American women writers
20th-century American writers
American women documentary filmmakers
Year of birth missing (living people)
American women academics
20th-century African-American women writers
20th-century African-American writers
21st-century African-American women writers
21st-century African-American writers